Earpod or ear pod or variant may refer to:

 Apple EarPods earphones introduced with iPhone 5; see Apple earbuds
 Acacia auriculiformis, the earpod or earpod wattle a tree from Australasia
 Enterolobium contortisiliquum, the earpod or Pacara earpod a tree
 Enterolobium cyclocarpum, the earpod a tree